Pierre Vidal may refer to:
 Peire Vidal (12th century), troubadour, name often modernized to "Pierre Vidal"
 Ernst Fischer (writer) (1899–1972), Austrian journalist, writer and politician who used the pseudonym Pierre Vidal
 Pierre Vidal (composer) (1927–2010), French composer
 Pierre Vidal-Naquet (1930–2006), French historian